Battista Negrone (Genoa, 1530 - Genoa, January 1592) was the 77th Doge of the Republic of Genoa.

Biography 
Part of that nobility considered "old", he was elected to the dogal title on 20 November 1589, the thirty-second in biennial succession and the seventy-seventh in history. Negrone ended his mandate on November 15, 1591 preferring to take care of his financial activities rather than a subsequent political career or post-state government. Battista Negrone died in Genoa in January 1592.

See also 

 Republic of Genoa
 Doge of Genoa

References 

16th-century Doges of Genoa
1530 births
1592 deaths